Phalaenopsis parishii is a species of orchid found from the eastern Himalaya to Indochina. 

It was named by Heinrich Gustav Reichenbach in honour of the botanist and plant collector Charles Parish in 1865.

References

External links 
 
 

parishii
Flora of the Indian subcontinent
Flora of Indo-China